Aleksandar Hristov (31 May 1904 – 12 March 1992) was a Bulgarian footballer. He competed in the men's tournament at the 1924 Summer Olympics.

Honours
Levski Sofia

 Bulgarian Championship – 1933
 Sofia Championship – 1923, 1924, 1925, 1929, 1933
 Ulpia Serdika Cup – 1926, 1930, 1931, 1932

References

External links
 

1904 births
1992 deaths
Bulgarian footballers
Bulgaria international footballers
Olympic footballers of Bulgaria
Footballers at the 1924 Summer Olympics
Footballers from Sofia
Association football defenders
PFC Levski Sofia players